A parlour or parlor game is a group game played indoors. They were often played in a parlour. These games were extremely popular among the upper and middle classes in the United Kingdom and in the United States during the Victorian era.

The Victorian age is sometimes considered the "Golden Age" of the parlour game. During the 19th century, the upper and middle classes had more leisure time than people of previous generations.  This led to the creation of a variety of parlour games to allow these gentlemen and ladies to amuse themselves at small parties.  Boxed parlour games were very popular from around 1920 until into the 1960s, especially around Christmas. Parlour games competed for attention with the mass media, particularly radio, movies, and television.  Though decreased in popularity, parlour games continue to be played.  Some remain nearly identical to their Victorian ancestors; others have been transformed into board games such as Balderdash.

Many parlour games involve logic or word-play.  Others are more physical games, but not to the extent of a sport or exercise. Some also involve dramatic skill, such as in charades.  Most do not require any equipment beyond what would be available in a typical parlour - ie the functioning mouths of the participants. Parlour games are usually competitive, but cumulative scores are not usually kept. The length and ending time of the game is typically not set; play continues until the players decide to end the game.

Parlour games are also interchangeably used with carnival games such as, but not limited to, "ping pong toss", "dart throwing", "strong man", and "dunk water". These can be played either indoors or outdoors and is usually accompanied with a token prize (i.e. stuffed animal) upon winning.

Examples

Examples of parlour games include:

Aesop's Mission
Are you there, Moriarty?
Carnelli
Charades
Consequences
Fictionary
Huckle buckle beanstalk
Hunt the thimble
I packed my bag
I spy
Kim's Game
Mafia
The Minister's Cat
Six Degrees of Kevin Bacon
Twenty questions
Wink murder

As a metaphor
By analogy, the phrase "parlour game" has been used to accuse political opponents of using deliberately nebulous or confusing language when describing their positions on issues.

See also

 Drawing room
 Party game
 Pub game
 Salon
 Tabletop game

References

Game terminology